Arctostaphylos purissima is a species of manzanita known by the common name La Purisima manzanita.

Distribution
The plant is endemic to western Santa Barbara County, California, including in the Santa Ynez Mountains and near Lompoc and the location of Mission La Purísima Concepción.

It is a plant of the Coastal sage scrub chaparral habitats, on sandstone soils.

Description
It varies in shape from low and spreading to tall and erect.

It is coated in long, white bristles and a dense foliage of shiny, hairless green leaves. Each leaf is round to oval in shape and smooth along the edges, and up to 2.5 centimeters long.

The inflorescence is a hanging cluster of spherical to urn-shaped manzanita flowers each about half a centimeter long.

The fruit is a hairless drupe between one half and one centimeter wide.

References

External links
Jepson Manual Treatment - Arctostaphylos purissima
USDA Plants Profile: Arctostaphylos purissima
Arctostaphylos purissima - Photo gallery

purissima
Endemic flora of California
Natural history of the California chaparral and woodlands
Natural history of Santa Barbara County, California
Natural history of the Transverse Ranges
Santa Ynez Mountains
Plants described in 1968